Phil Bates (born 1953) is an English musician 

Phil Bates may also refer to:

 Phil Bates (footballer) (1897–1974), English footballer
 Phil Bates (gridiron football) (born 1989), American football wide receiver
 Phil Bates (jazz musician) (born 1931), English jazz double bassist